The Brain Research Foundation (BRF) is a non-profit private organization in Chicago, Illinois. The foundation was established in 1953 to promote and support scientific research concerning the brain. The BRF aides scientists in their pursuits to understand, prevent, treat, and cure brain disorders. Brain tumors, multiple sclerosis, Alzheimer's and Parkinson's diseases, epilepsy, amyotrophic lateral sclerosis (ALS), learning disorders, depression and many others are disorders the BRF has helped raise awareness for.

External links
Brain Research Foundation Homepage

Medical and health foundations in the United States
Organizations established in 1953
Non-profit organizations based in Chicago